Odostomia alia is a species of sea snail, a marine gastropod mollusk in the family Pyramidellidae, the pyrams and their allies.

Description
The white, shiny, slightly ovoid shell grows to a length of 1.6 mm. The teleoconch contains four smooth, turreted whorls. The body whorl measures ⅔ of the total length of the shell. The growth lines are leaning forward (adapically) with respect to the direction of the cone. Just like Eulimella polita, the aperture has a continuous peristome, but, in contrast, has no columellar fold. The outer lip lacks teeth.

Distribution
This species occurs in the Atlantic Ocean from Mauritania to the Congo region at a depth of 36 m.

References

External links
 To Encyclopedia of Life
 To USNM Invertebrate Zoology Mollusca Collection

alia
Molluscs of the Atlantic Ocean
Gastropods described in 1999